Carl Theodore Heisel (1852–1937) was a mathematical  crank who wrote several books in the 1930s challenging accepted mathematical truths. Among his claims is that he found a way to square the circle. He is credited with 24 works in 62 publications. Heisel did not charge money for his books; he gave thousands of them away for free. Because of this, they are available at many libraries and universities. Heisel's books have historic and monetary value. Paul Halmos referred to one of Heisel's works as a "classic crank book."

Selected works

References

Pseudomathematics
1852 births
1937 deaths